Shackelton  is a ghost town in Chattooga County, in the U.S. state of Georgia.

History
Shackelton was founded in 1909 as a mining community, and was abandoned in the 1920s when the nearby mines closed. A post office called Shackelton was in operation during 1910 and 1911.

References

Geography of Chattooga County, Georgia
Ghost towns in Georgia (U.S. state)